Orth can refer to:

Places
 Orth, Minnesota, an unincorporated community in Nore Township, Minnesota, United States
 Orth an der Donau, a town in Gänserndorf, Lower Austria, Austria
 Orth House, a historic house in Winnetka, Illinois, United States
 Orth C. Galloway House, a historic house in Clarendon, Arkansas, United States
 Schloss Orth, a castle on Traunsee lake, Austria

People
 Al Orth (1872–1948), American baseball player
 August Orth (1828–1901), German architect
 Bertram Orth (1848–1931), German-Canadian prelate of the Catholic Church
 Brodie Orth, American rugby union player
 Christian Henry Orth (1773–1816), American politician
 David Orth (b. 1965), Canadian actor
 Eduard Orth (1902–1968), German politician
 Elisa Orth (born c. 1984), Brazilian researcher
 Florian Orth (b. 1989), German athlete
 Frank Orth (1880–1962), American actor
 Franklin Orth (1907–1970), American executive of the National Rifle Association and President of the US Olympic Committee
 Gérard Orth (b. 1936), French virologist
 Godlove Stein Orth (1817–1882), American congressman
 György Orth (1901–1962), Hungarian footballer
 Haruka Orth (b. 1982), Hungarian-American actress
 Harold (Henry) William Orth (1866–1946), American architect
 Henry Orth (American football) (1897–1980), American football player
 Heide Orth (b. 1942), German tennis player
 Haruka Orth (b. 1982), Hungarian-American actress
 Jaqueline Orth (b. 1993), German sport shooter
 Joaquin Orth (b. 1955), Mexican equestrian
 John Orth, American vocalist of Holopaw
 John V. Orth, American professor
 Johann Orth, assumed name of Archduke Johann Salvator of Austria after renouncing royal titles
 Johannes Orth (1847–1923), German pathologist
 Josef Orth (1914–?), Czech football player
 Karin Orth (b. 1963), German historian
 Kim Orth, American biochemist
 Maggie Orth (b. 1964), American artist and technologist
 Maren Orth (b. 1990), German runner
 Marisa Orth (b. 1963), Brazilian actress
 Maureen Orth (b. 1943), American journalist
 Myra Orth (1934–2002), American art historian
 Louise Orth, stage name of Luise Jaide (1842–1914), German opera singer
 Oswald Orth (1832–1920), English professor
 Viktor Orth (1853–1919), outsider artist
 Zak Orth (b. 1970), American actor

Given name:
 Orth Collins (1880–1949), American Baseball player

Other
 Arvas, formerly known as Örth, a Norwegian black metal band
 4533 Orth (1986 EL), a main-belt asteroid
 Orthrus, two-headed dog in Greek mythology
 Orthography
 Orth is a fictional language in the novel Anathem by Neal Stephenson
 Orth is the name of the main human settlement in Made in Abyss.

See also
 Ort (disambiguation)
 North (disambiguation)